Liberty Township is a suburb of Cincinnati located in Butler County, Ohio. It is one of thirteen townships in Butler County, Ohio, United States.  The population was 43,999 at the 2020 census.  It is located on the east-central part of the county, just south of the city of Monroe. It was named for Liberty, Pennsylvania, at the suggestion of John Morrow, a resident in the township at the time of its formation in 1803 who was the brother of Ohio Governor Jeremiah Morrow, after his hometown. The first settler was John Nelson, who arrived in 1796, seven years before Ohio became a state. It is one of 25 Liberty Townships statewide.

The northeast corner of the township is part of the city of Monroe, the sole municipality in Liberty Township. Unincorporated places are Bethany, Four Bridges, Hughes Station, Kyles Station, Jericho, and Princeton.

Geography
The original boundaries included what is now West Chester Township, which was separated from Liberty Township by the Butler County Commissioners on June 2, 1823.  Today, the township is located in the eastern part of the county and borders the following townships:
Lemon Township - north
Turtlecreek Township, Warren County - northeast
Deerfield Township, Warren County - southeast
West Chester Township - south
Fairfield Township - west
Madison Township - northwest, across the Great Miami River

Government
The township is governed by a three-member board of trustees, who are elected in November of odd-numbered years to a four-year term beginning on the following January 1.  Two are elected in the year after the presidential election and one is elected in the year before it.  There is also an elected township fiscal officer, who serves a four-year term beginning on April 1 of the year after the election, which is held in November of the year before the presidential election.  Vacancies in the fiscal officership or on the board of trustees are filled by the remaining trustees.  Day-to-day functions are overseen by a township administrator, hired by the trustees, who typically has an assistant, also approved by the trustees.
All of Liberty Township lies in  Ohio's 8th congressional district which elected John Boehner as its Representative until he resigned in October 2015. He was then succeeded by current Representative Warren Davidson.  
Politically, Liberty Township leans heavily toward the Republican Party, although it has narrowed slightly in recent elections.  In the 2004 presidential election, George Bush carried the township with over 80% of the vote. In the 2020 Election, Donald Trump won the Township with 59.9% of the vote.

Transportation, utilities, and schools

The Miami and Erie Canal passed through the northwest corner of the township.  The Dayton Short Line, now the Norfolk Southern, ran through the township.

The old Cincinnati and Dayton Turnpike, later known as Dixie Highway and U.S. Route 25, is now Cincinnati-Dayton Road.  It connects the township to Monroe to the north and Sharonville to the south. Major highways today include the Butler County Veterans Highway (also known as State Route 129), which connects Interstate 75 to Hamilton through the southern tier of the township, and State Route 4, which links Hamilton to Middletown. I-75 runs through the eastern edge of the township with direct access to Liberty Township at Liberty Way (Exit 24), plus at two exits along the Butler County Veterans Highway (State Route 129).

Climate

Notable people
Margaret Conditt, state representative
Luke Null, Comedian

Demographics

References

Further reading
Bert S. Barlow, W.H. Todhunter, Stephen D. Cone, Joseph J. Pater, and Frederick Schneider, eds.  Centennial History of Butler County, Ohio.  Hamilton, Ohio:  B.F. Bowen, 1905.
Jim Blount.  The 1900s:  100 Years In the History of Butler County, Ohio.  Hamilton, Ohio:  Past Present Press, 2000.
Butler County Engineer's Office.  Butler County Official Transportation Map, 2003.  Fairfield Township, Butler County, Ohio:  The Office, 2003.
A History and Biographical Cyclopaedia of Butler County, Ohio with Illustrations and Sketches of Its Representative Men and Pioneers.  Cincinnati, Ohio:  Western Biographical Publishing Company, 1882. 
Ohio. Secretary of State.  The Ohio municipal and township roster, 2002-2003.  Columbus, Ohio:  The Secretary, 2003.

External links
Township website
County website

Townships in Butler County, Ohio
Populated places established in 1796
1810 establishments in Ohio
Populated places established in 1810
Townships in Ohio